Yefyus is a small island in the shallow sea south of the Bird's Head Peninsula of New Guinea. It is known in Indonesian as Pulau Yus ( Yus Island), and its name was previously spelt using the Dutch orthography as Jef Joes.

Yefyus is about 300 meters long and 150 meters wide, and is in the middle of a coral reef. The land is covered by a patch of forest, which is surrounded by beaches of coral sand. There is a tower with a light on the island, and on the edge of the reef a shipwreck.

Sources 

Islands of Western New Guinea
Landforms of Southwest Papua